Varma Voitto Kallio (3 April 1920, Helsinki – 25 October 2003) was a Finnish Government Counsellor and politician who served as Minister of Education in Kalevi Sorsa's government in 1974, from 1 June to 9 September,  representing the Finnish Social Democratic Party.

References

Social Democratic Party of Finland politicians
1920 births
2003 deaths
Politicians from Helsinki
Ministers of Education of Finland
Members of the Parliament of Finland (1972–75)
20th-century Finnish politicians